The anterior auricular muscle, the smallest of the three auricular muscles, is thin and fan-shaped, and its fibers are pale and indistinct. It arises from the lateral edge of the epicranial aponeurosis, and its fibers converge to be inserted into a projection on the front of the helix.

Structure 
The anterior auricular muscle arises from the lateral edge of the epicranial aponeurosis. It inserts into a projection on the front of the helix.

Nerve supply 
The anterior auricular muscle is supplied is supplied by the temporal branch of the facial nerve (VII). It may also receive some small branches from the auriculotemporal nerve, a branch of the mandibular nerve, itself a branch of the trigeminal nerve (V).

Relations 
The anterior auricular muscle is the smallest of the three auricular muscles.

The superficial temporal artery, a branch of the external carotid artery, travels underneath the anterior auricular muscle to supply the auricle of the outer ear.

Function 
The anterior auricular muscle draws the auricle of the outer ear upwards and forwards. This is a very subtle movement in most people, although some people can wiggle their ears.

See also 

 Superior auricular muscle
 Posterior auricular muscle

Additional images

References 

Muscles of the head and neck